Douai is a town and commune in northern France.

Douai may also refer to:

In or around the French commune
 Arrondissement of Douai, an administrative division
 Canton of Douai, an administrative division
 Douai station in the town
 University of Douai

Other
 Douai Mountain in the Canadian Rockies
 Adolph Douai (1819–1888), German-American Marxist
 Douai Abbey, Benedictine abbey in Berkshire, England
 Douai School run by the abbey

See also
 Douay–Rheims Bible, an English translation used by the Catholic Church